Margaret Ferguson Winner (1866 - December 21, 1937) was an illustrator, portrait painter, and miniaturist.

She was born and raised in Philadelphia and held a Fellowship at the Pennsylvania Academy of Fine Arts. Musical composer Septimus Winner was her father.

As a painter, she completed 13 portraits for Dickinson College. The paintings she did of Dickinson presidents hung in Old West and Bosler Hall.

She painted a portrait of John Kirk McCurdy, a Rough Rider, that is part of the permanent collection at the National Portrait Gallery in Washington D.C. She painted Supreme Court Justice Roger Brooke Taney, posthumously, and also painted a portrait of Dr. William Ruoff.

She lived at 1706 North 16th Street.

Her photograph appears in the book Septimus Winner: Two Lives in Music. She was a member of the Art Alliance and Plastic Club.

Books she illustrated
Her Very Best (1901) by Amy E. Blanchard
Dearie, Dot, and the Dog (1904) by Julie M. Lippmann
Mistress Moppet (1904) by Annie M. Barnes

References

1866 births
1937 deaths
American women illustrators
20th-century American women artists
American women painters